Nicolai Schejtli (24 June 1753 – 4 April 1824) was a Norwegian mining official and politician.

Nicolai Schejtli was born is Christiania now Oslo. His father was Public procurator and later Magistrate in Øvre Romerike.
From 1802, Nicolai Schejtli served in Buskerud as commissioner of the Kongsberg Silver Mines (Kongsberg Sølvverk)  and  Blaafarveværket  mining company at Åmot in Modum.

He represented Drammen at the Norwegian Constituent Assembly at Eidsvoll in 1814. He was also a member of the Parliament of Norway where he represented Drammen during 1818.

References

External links
Blaafarveværket  official website

1753 births
1824 deaths
Politicians from Drammen
Fathers of the Constitution of Norway
Members of the Storting